The 1994 United States Senate election in Arizona was held November 8, 1994. Incumbent Democratic U.S. Senator Dennis DeConcini decided to retire instead of seeking a fourth term. Republican nominee Jon Kyl won the open seat, becoming the first Republican to win Arizona's Class 1 Senate seat since Paul Fannin in 1970. Democrats would not win this seat again, or any Senate race in the state, until Kyrsten Sinema's victory in 2018.

Democratic primary

Candidates 
 Sam Coppersmith, U.S. Representative
 Richard D. Mahoney, Secretary of State of Arizona
 Cindy Resnick, State Senator
 Dave Moss, perennial candidate

Results

Republican primary

Candidates 
 Jon Kyl, U.S. Representative since 1987

Results

Libertarian primary

Candidates 
 Scott Grainger, engineer

Results

General election

Polling

Results

See also 
 1994 United States Senate elections

References 

1994
Arizona
1994 Arizona elections